Breese Stevens Municipal Athletic Field is a multi-purpose stadium in Madison, Wisconsin. Located eight blocks northeast of the Wisconsin State Capitol on the Madison Isthmus, it is the oldest extant masonry grandstand in Wisconsin.

The field is named in honor of Breese J. Stevens (1834–1903), a mayor of Madison and a University of Wisconsin–Madison regent, on the wishes of his widow, who sold the land to the city. The complex was designated as a Madison Landmark in 1995 and was accepted for inclusion on the National Register of Historic Places and the Wisconsin State Register of Historic Places in 2014.

The venue currently seats nearly 5,000, which can be expanded to 9,333 for concerts. 

It is home to Edgewood College teams; Madison East High School teams, the Madison 56ers amateur soccer team; the semi-professional Ultimate frisbee team, the Madison Radicals, and the USL League One soccer team Forward Madison FC. It has hosted Wisconsin Interscholastic Athletic Association's girls' soccer tournaments and an exhibition match of Australian football. The field has also hosted ice skating, boxing, wrestling, lacrosse, track and field, midget car racing, rodeos, circuses, drum and bugle corps competitions, concerts, and fraternal and religious gatherings.

History

Acquiring the park
Addressing the concern that Madison's sports facilities were insufficient, the city council began efforts to establish a new athletic field in 1922. After first trying to obtain the land by donation, a joint committee of the council and the Association of Commerce considered sites such as Olbrich Park and what is today's Georgia O'Keeffe Middle School playground. The council ultimately selected a block of 18 lots fronting East Washington Avenue and bounded by Mifflin, Brearly and Paterson streets. The site also had the advantage of being midway between Central High School and East High School. The property was owned by the widow of Breese Stevens. To help raise money for the project, Wisconsin Supreme Court Justice Burr W. Jones consented to the selling of property at Livingston and East Washington that he had previously donated to the city as a playground, on condition the new athletic field be named for him. On September 28, 1923, the city council acceded to Mrs. Stevens's terms that the field be named for her late husband instead, and purchased the property for $35,000.

Construction
The city of Madison built the brick grandstand in 1925. The original grandstand, designed by the Madison architectural firm of Claude and Starck in the Mediterranean Revival style, was constructed from 1925 to 1926 and dedicated on May 5, 1926. The stone wall surrounding the perimeter was built in 1934 as a project of the Civil Works Administration using quarry rock from Madison's Hoyt Park. The concrete bleachers were also built in 1934, and the wooden press box was added in 1939. Three heating units were installed in 1945, and two years later the new electric scoreboard was erected.

Lighting the field
The first night-baseball game in Wisconsin was held at the field on July 7, 1930, resulting in a defeat for the California Owls, a team that toured with its own floodlights. Attendance was impressive enough that a trio of local electrical contractors headed by Otto Harloff formed the Madison Entertainment Corporation. After the city council approved their plan, the group purchased and installed 90 Crouse-Hinds floodlights on ten 90-foot towers at Breese for $29,100. Sparing the city the cost, the company recouped its outlay with a percentage of the gate receipts until the cost was met, with ownership of the lights then transferring to the city. A $4,000 public address system was also installed, as well as a lunchroom underneath the grandstand, serving coffee, soft drinks, sandwiches, and candy. Preceded by a parade, the new lights' official debut was a Madison Blues baseball game on May 15, 1931.

The ability to hold events at night multiplied the use of the facility. The lights were credited with saving scholastic sports when high schools began collecting one-third of the gate receipts from their night games. The lights also proved a boon to Madison Blues baseball, drawing fans from home and away. The team received 50% of the gate, and their schedule became flexible to host more exhibition games. The first-night boxing match was in September, and the first-night football game was held the next night, between the Chicago Cards and the Harley Mills. While respecting the precedence of free recreational events hosted by the city, the Madison Entertainment Corporation became the promoter of nearly all night events.

Sporting events
Upon its inception, Breese Stevens Field became the premier site for Madison's major athletic events outside the University of Wisconsin. A multi-purpose facility with a cinder track, the field was employed year-round for sports, ranging from marbles tournaments to National Football League games. Currently, it is the home field for USL League One soccer team Forward Madison FC.

Baseball
Breese Stevens Field was the home of the semi-professional baseball team the Madison Blues from 1926 to 1942. Founded by the Madison Athletic Association and captained by manager Eddie Lenehan, the Blues were first an independent team before joining the Wisconsin-Illinois League in 1926. They won the championship of the newly formed Tri-State League in 1938, defeating the Sheboygan Chairs. They joined the Three-I League in 1940.

The field also held special exhibition games with major league teams such as the Chicago Cubs, Chicago White Sox and the St. Louis Browns, in addition to games against Negro league teams and traveling clubs like the House of David. In 1947 legendary ace pitcher Satchel Paige of the Negro leagues' Kansas City Monarchs defeated the Industrial League All-Stars 14-5. Warren Spahn, later the star left-handed pitcher for the Milwaukee Braves, took the Breese mound many times in 1941 as a member of the visiting Evansville Bees. Although he was known as a University of Wisconsin football player, Elroy "Crazy Legs" Hirsch belted a grand slam home run in an exhibition game/war bond rally in 1944. In 1946 the New York Yankees held a three-day tryout camp at Breese.

In the spring of 1932 the Madison city council opened the field's gates to amateur baseball, allowing twenty teams in two leagues to play free games on Sundays. The diamond was also used by the University of Wisconsin Badger baseball team, and the Madison Industrial League, which formed in 1943.

National league softball games were first played there in 1933, with Madison defeating Beaver Dam, 21-1. Girls' softball games were held as early as 1944.

Football
High school football games were a staple of the field's schedule, with nearly all local high school home games played there. For many years Madison East and Central High Schools made a tradition of facing off on Armistice Day.

Only three National Football League games were played at Breese: In 1927 the Milwaukee Badgers were beaten by the Duluth Eskimos, 32-0. In 1929 legendary halfback Red Grange helped his team, the Chicago Bears, defeat the Minneapolis Red Jackets, 19-6. In 1931 star fullback Ernie Nevers led his Chicago Cardinals to trounce the Chicago Mills, 25-0.

High school football returned in 2015 when Madison East resumed playing its varsity home games at the field.

Other sports

Jesse Owens, gold medalist sprinter of the 1936 Berlin Olympics, ran in three exhibition races at the field in 1938 following a Madison Blues baseball game.

The Madison Stampede rodeo event was held over six days in 1931.

In 1938 midget auto races were held before being banned the next year over concerns of noise and damage to the field's track.

The stadium hosted WIAA soccer tournaments from 1989 to 2002 and was also the home field for the Madison East and Madison La Follette high school teams.

Since 2013, the Madison Radicals of the American Ultimate Disc League (AUDL) have played their home games at the field.  The AUDL championship weekend was held at Breese Stevens Field for the second time, on August 11-12, 2018, and concluded with the Radicals earning their first league title.

Breese Stevens Field is also home to a few soccer teams. Since 2005, the Madison 56ers of the UPSL have played at the stadium. Forward Madison FC of USL1 began to play at the field in 2019.

Decline and revival
By the late 1960s, Breese Stevens Field lost its status as the city's premier athletic complex as modern facilities, such as Mansfield Stadium, began to appear in suburban Madison.

On August 3, 1968, a weekly teen dance held at Breese broke out in racially charged fights, with the violence escalating outside when a black teenager was struck by a car that was then attacked. The "Breese Stevens incident" prompted criticism of Madison police, and led to a city investigation of local race relations.

As Breese further showed its age in the 1970s, proposals were made for the city to use the property for other purposes. In 1972 Madison Mayor Bill Dyke supported placing a long-anticipated civic auditorium there. Three years later the city removed legal obstacles to making the field part of a planned East Washington Avenue campus for Madison Area Technical College, but support for site dropped. A 1979 estimate for restoring the facility was put at $240,000.

In 1981, the city council voted to allocate $60,000 to demolish the grandstand and shore up the exterior wall and Mifflin Street bleachers. "It's a matter of liability,' said Parks Department Superintendent Dan Stapay. "We've got letters on file dating back to 1967 that warn of structural problems."

A public outcry led to the establishment of the field as a soccer venue in 1982. Minor league baseball returned to Breese on April 27, 1982, when the Madison Muskies made their debut there before adopting Warner Park as their home field. In 1983 the city council voted to allocate $230,000 to gradually restore the park by fixing the grandstand roof, sagging walls and broken toilets. Artificial turf replaced the original grass field in 2014. 

In 2018, prior to Forward Madison FC’s arrival, the field received upgrades, including new bathrooms, a concession stand, and more seating, upgrading the capacity to an estimated 5,000 people.

External links

"Breese Stevens Field gets recognized as a national landmark", Isthmus, 5 December 2014

References

Minor league baseball venues
Soccer venues in Wisconsin
Music venues in Wisconsin
Sports venues in Madison, Wisconsin
National Register of Historic Places in Madison, Wisconsin
Defunct National Premier Soccer League stadiums
Sports venues on the National Register of Historic Places in Wisconsin
Ultimate (sport) venues
Sports venues completed in 1926
1926 establishments in Wisconsin
USL League One stadiums
Forward Madison FC
Defunct Midwest League ballparks